Finnegans Brew Co. is a Minnesota-based brewery founded in September 2000, known for donating 100% of its profits back to the community. Proceeds are donated to the Finnegans Community Fund, which focuses on feeding the hungry by working with local food banks and produce growers.

Mission + Values 
Turning beer into food.

Finnegans believes that we are all responsible for creating healthy communities. Finnegans believe in creating and supporting self-sustaining business models that have a positive social impact in the community. Creating awareness and action about critical community issues through projects that are fun, social and a win-win for our volunteers, pro-bono partners, and business partners.

FINNEGANS Community Fund (FCF) a 501c3 non-profit exists to create sustainable change for those affected by hunger through profits from FINNEGANS, volunteers, events and partnerships.

Beers 
The company's beers include:
 Finnegans Irish Ale, their flagship ale
 Cluster Truck IPA, an American IPA
 Tipped Cow Farmhouse Ale, a Belgian-inspired Saison style
 East Town Pilsner, a traditional Czech-style Pilsner
Clocked Out, EOD Unfiltered Wheat
Tile Factory, Mosaic India Pale Ale
Armory Laker Blonde
Brim Reaper, Rye India Pale Ale
 Dead Irish Poet Stout, a Cork-style Extra Stout
 Barrels of Life Series and other limited-edition brews

Finnegans distributes their brews to Minnesota, North and South Dakota, Iowa, and Wisconsin.

History
In 1997, Jacquie Berglund moved to Minnesota. She was offered a job by Kieran Folliard, founder of 2 Gingers Irish Whiskey and Kieran's Irish Pub in Minneapolis, Minnesota, as the director of marketing. While working with Folliard, Berglund decided to begin brewing beer, and to use the profits for a worthy cause. Folliard sold Berglund his part of what at the time was called "Kieran's Irish Potato Ale" for $1, which would eventually become Finnegans' Irish Amber Ale.

The company ran into some problems when the IRS disagreed that a beer company could be a non-profit as their primary work involved no charity. Berglund set up Finnegans as a beer company which donated all profits to the Finnegans Community Fund. She was the only employee of Finnegans up until 2009.

In 2003, brewing moved from the James Page Brewery in Minneapolis to Summit Brewing Company in St. Paul, Minnesota.

In 2007, Finnegans reached $100,000 in donations and expanded outside of Minnesota to Wisconsin and North Dakota. Proceeds were donated to charities working to end the cycle of poverty. Finnegans partners with The Food Group, Great Plains Food Bank, Feeding South Dakota and Hunger Task Force to make an impact in Minnesota, North Dakota, South Dakota and Wisconsin along with local farms throughout the Midwest.

Finnegans celebrated its 10-year anniversary in 2010 and shifted its focus to alleviating hunger. In 2011, Finnegans raised $45,000 in donations for the funding of 6 new farm and food shelf partnerships. That year, Finnegans also fielded a team for the MS150 bicycle ride from Duluth to Minneapolis to raise money for multiple sclerosis. The Finnegans MS150 team has been part of Bike MS ever since and are among the top fundraising teams each year.

In 2013, Finnegans first released its first beer in cans, starting with Irish Amber and Blonde Ale. Since then, a variety of the Finnegan's beers are canned and distributed throughout Minnesota, North Dakota, South Dakota and Wisconsin

In October 2017, Finnegans hired their first head brewer, Ryan Mihm (formerly of New Belgium in Colorado and Allagash Brewing Company in Maine), to guide their craft brewing process.

On March 30, 2017, Finnegans staged the "Chef Food Fight", inviting five Twin Cities Chefs to go head-to-head in a live cook-off featuring Finnegans-inspired recipes. Chef Vincent Francoual of Kierans Irish Pubs was crowned the champion and all proceeds benefited Minnesota FoodShare's March campaign.

In March 2018, the company unveiled Finnegans House to the public in the Elliot Park neighborhood of east downtown Minneapolis. The 17,520 square foot facility includes a brewery, taproom, Finnovation Lab (a social business incubator and community workspace), and a members-only social club and event space called the Brewer's Den.

Finnegans celebrated their 20th anniversary on September 1, 2020. Their long time supporters, employees and neighbors celebrated two decades of Finnegans being the only brewery that donates all of its profits to feeding the hungry.

In October 2020, Finnegans placed in the top twenty IPAs as part of the Alpha King Challenge  that were part of the Great American Beer Festival.

Jacquie Berglund 
Jacquie Berglund is The Rambunctious Social Entrepreneur, CEO of FINNEGANS Brew Co. and founder of FINNEGANS SBC, the first beer company in the world to donate 100% of profits to fund fresh produce for those in need. Through the creation of both FINNEGANS SBC, and its nonprofit counterpart, FINNEGANS Community Fund, Berglund has championed an innovative, market-based approach to addressing and raising awareness about food security in communities across the Midwest.

In 2018, FINNEGANS opened its first ever brewery and taproom in the FINNEGANS House in the  Kraus Anderson block development in East Town Minneapolis.

Berglund also founded the FINNOVATION Lab in 2017, a social business incubator and venture services company, also located in the FINNEGANS House.

Berglund graduated from Augsburg College with a degree in communications and political science and has a Master of Arts Degree in International Relations and Diplomacy from the American Graduate School in Paris. Berglund has pursued her entrepreneurial spirit to make the world a better place, from being an important role in bringing together government officials through the OECD to train Baltic countries in market economy laws, to Marketing Director at the successful Cara Pubs where the spark for FINNEGANS began.

Berglund has generated over a million dollars in impact through FINNEGANS profits, partnerships and successful events, while raising significant awareness about local hunger issues. Driven to innovate with astute leadership, and the ability to rally people and organizations for a cause, she has built the second longest running social enterprise that donates 100% of profits (behind Newman’s Own Foundation). She has built a team of eight full-time dedicated staff and fifteen part-time staff as well as engaged thousands of volunteers and supporters to move the mission forward and scale FINNEGANS’ impact.

Berglund’s trail blazing social enterprise has earned her prominent accolades over the years. Berglund received a “40 under 40” nomination from the Minneapolis St. Paul Business Journal, which recognizes and honors the top 40 business people in the Twin Cities under the age of 40. She is also a recipient of the Minnesota Jaycee top honor of Ten Young Outstanding Minnesotans, and in 2010 she was featured on CNN’s “Leaders with Heart” and “Small Business Success Stories” segments. Berglund was named one of the “200 Minnesotans You Should Know” by Twin Cities Business magazine and was  nominated as a 100 Year Centennial Award honoree by the Girl Scouts. In 2012, FINNEGANS was awarded the Small Business of the Year Award by the Minneapolis Chamber of Commerce, and they also received the Social Entrepreneur of the Year award from Minnesota Business Magazine.  Berglund was awarded a Bush Fellowship in 2014. Berglund was selected as one of 12 business leaders to watch in 2016 by the Minneapolis St. Paul Business Journal and was named a 2016 Trail Blazer by Growler Magazine.

In 2018, Berglund was selected as 50 over 50 by AARP and FINNEGANS received the Made in MN Manufacturing Legacy Award from Minnesota Business Magazine.  Berglund was also selected a 2018 ‘Leader in Giving’ by Twin Cities Business Magazine.

Finnegans House 
FINNEGANS SBC (Specific Benefit Corporation) is the first beer company in the world to donate 100 percent of its profits to charity and continues to donate 100 percent of its profits through a licensing agreement with FINNEGANS Brew Co.

FINNEGANS Brew Co. is a new company created to brew the beer, operate the brewery and Brewer’s Den under license from FINNEGANS SBC.

The FINNEGANS Community Fund is a 501©3 dedicated to alleviating hunger in all markets where FINNEGANS products are sold.

The FINNovation Lab is a newly created company, which is a social business incubator and accelerator, including the FINNOVATION Lab Fellows. The FINNovation Lab is located on the top floor of the FINNEGANS House.

References

Companies based in Minneapolis
American companies established in 2000
Food and drink companies established in 2000
2000 establishments in Minnesota
Non-profit corporations
Beer brewing companies based in Minnesota
Non-profit organizations based in Minnesota